Mark Fodya (born 22 December 1997) is a Malawian professional footballer who plays as a left-back for the Malawian club Silver Strikers, and the Malawi national team.

International career
Fodya made his international debut with the Malawi national team in a 2–2 2021 COSAFA Cup tie with Zimbabwe on 9 July 2021. He was part of the Malawi squad the 2021 Africa Cup of Nations.

References

External links
 
 

1997 births
Living people
Malawian footballers
Malawi international footballers
Association football fullbacks
2021 Africa Cup of Nations players